Sanjay Chaudhary is an Indian politician and member of the Bharatiya Janata Party. Chaudhary is a member of the Himachal Pradesh Legislative Assembly from the Kangra constituency in Kangra district. He is the son of Roshan Lal.

References 

People from Kangra, Himachal Pradesh
Bharatiya Janata Party politicians from Himachal Pradesh
Himachal Pradesh MLAs 2007–2012
Living people
21st-century Indian politicians
Year of birth missing (living people)